The vastus intermedius (Cruraeus) arises from the front and lateral surfaces of the body of the femur in its upper two-thirds, sitting under the rectus femoris muscle and from the lower part of the lateral intermuscular septum. Its fibers end in a superficial aponeurosis, which forms the deep part of the quadriceps femoris tendon.

The vastus medialis and vastus intermedius appear to be inseparably united, but when the rectus femoris has been reflected during dissection a narrow interval will be observed extending upward from the medial border of the patella between the two muscles, and the separation may be continued as far as the lower part of the intertrochanteric line, where, however, the two muscles are frequently continuous.

Due to being the deeper middle-most of the quadriceps muscle group, the intermedius is the most difficult to stretch once maximum knee flexion is attained. It cannot be further stretched by hip extension as the rectus femoris can, nor is it accessible to manipulate with massage therapy to stretch the fibres sideways as the vastus lateralis and vastus medialis are.

Additional images

References

External links
PTCentral
Massage st. louis

Knee extensors
Muscles of the quadriceps
Anterior compartment of thigh
Muscles of the lower limb